Schildknecht is a German surname. Notable people with the surname include:

David Schildknecht, American wine critic
Julieta Schildknecht (born 1960), Swiss-Brazilian photographer and journalist

German-language surnames